Kampong Burong Pingai Ayer is a village in Brunei-Muara District, Brunei, within Mukim Burong Pingai Ayer. It is located within Kampong Ayer, the traditional stilted settlements on the Brunei River in the country's capital Bandar Seri Begawan. The population was 514 in 2016.

Name 
The village was formerly known as "Kampong Burong Pingai" until the name was added with the term "Ayer" in the 1960s to distinguish it from the land village Kampong Burong Pingai Berakas.

Facilities

Mosque 
Pehin Datu Imam Haji Abdul Mokti Mosque is the village mosque and was inaugurated by His Royal Highness Prince Sufri Bolkiah on 6 February 1981. The mosque can accommodate 350 worshippers. It is named after a certain pious man who was born in the village.

References 

Neighbourhoods in Bandar Seri Begawan
Villages in Brunei-Muara District